CBDB is an American progressive rock band based in Tuscaloosa, Alabama. The band was founded in 2011 by Cy Simonton (vocals, guitar), Kris Gottlieb (lead guitar), and Glenn Dillard (saxophone, keyboards). Blake Gallant (bass) joined in 2018, followed by Chris Potocik (drums) in 2020. CBDB are the self-proclaimed purveyors of Joyfunk.

Releases
CBDB's debut album, phone.keys.wallet., was released in November 2012 and saw
rapid success, with hook-heavy songs like "Slow Foxes", "Caroline", and "How Long".
They released their second album, Joyfunk Is Dead, on 24 February 2015. The facetiously-titled sophomore effort takes Joyfunk down a more progressive route
while still keeping its hook and groove-oriented roots.
In July 2015, the band spent one day in the renowned FAME Studios in Muscle Shoals, Alabama.  They recorded 
four tracks in a 13.5-hour session.  They released The Fame EP on 25 September 2015. In July 2016, they spent time at Blackbird Studios in Nashville, Tennessee. They released two singles: "She's Mobile" and "Old Dog", from the sessions in December 2016. Most recently, CBDB released Out of Line in May 2018. They recorded this album at Zac Brown's Southern Ground Studios in Nashville, Tennessee. Two singles emerged from the record: "Unintentional Liar" and "Opelika Yella". In May 2020, CBDB issued the non-album single "Back in Limbo".

Touring
CBDB has built a strong presence through steady touring of the American Southeast, playing headlining shows in halls such as the Georgia Theatre, Druid City Music Hall, Zydeco, Bourbon Street, Terminal West, Proud Larry's, and Exit/In. They have shared the stage with acts including Umphreys McGee, Blues Traveler, The Wailers, The Revivalists, Col. Bruce Hampton (Ret.), and Perpetual Groove, among others. The band has played various music festivals, such as Hulaween, Okeechobee Music Festival, Backwoods Music Festival, Euphoria Music Festival, Summercamp Music Festival, Sweetwater 420 Fest, SlossFest, Electric Forest, and The Werk Out Music Festival.

Discography
Studio albums
 phone.keys.wallet. (2012)
 Joyfunk Is Dead (2015)
 Out of Line (2018)

EPs
 The Fame (2015)

Singles
 "She's Mobile" (2016)
 "Old Dog" (2016)
 "Unintentional Liar" (2018)
 "Opelika Yella" (2018)
 "Back in Limbo" (2020)

References

External links

American progressive rock groups
Musical groups established in 2011
Rock music groups from Alabama
2011 establishments in Alabama